Punkhorn Creek is a small stream in the middle of Byram Township, Sussex County, New Jersey. It flows southwest from Lake Bottom, on the north side of and parallel with Amity Road, to Roseville Pond. It is a tributary of Lubbers Run, which is a tributary of the Musconetcong River. It joins Lubbers Run at Lake Lackawanna.

See also
List of rivers of New Jersey

References

Rivers of New Jersey
Rivers of Sussex County, New Jersey
Musconetcong River
Tributaries of the Delaware River